Isia alcumena is a moth of the subfamily Arctiinae. It was described by Carlos Berg in 1882 and is found in Argentina, Venezuela, Brazil and Bolivia.

Subspecies
Isia alcumena alcumena (Argentina)
Isia alcumena flavitincta (Rothschild, 1910) (Venezuela)
Isia alcumena kennedyi (Rothschild, 1910) (Brazil: Minas Geraes)
Isia alcumena steinbachi (Rothschild, 1910) (Bolivia)

References

 Arctiidae genus list at Butterflies and Moths of the World of the Natural History Museum

Arctiinae
Moths described in 1882